Otter Creek Bridge may refer to:

Otter Creek Bridge (Oelwein, Iowa), listed on the NRHP in Fayette County, Iowa 
Otter Creek Bridge (Hazleton, Iowa), formerly listed on the NRHP in Iowa, in Buchanan County
Otter Creek Bridge (Cedar Vale, Kansas), listed on the NRHP in Chautauqua County, Kansas
North Branch Otter Creek Bridge, Piedmont, Kansas, listed on the NRHP in Greenwood County, Kansas